Miss Globe is a global beauty pageant group that holds annual events. Currently, Miss Globe is produced simultaneously by three various organizations claiming to be the official organizers. The Miss Globe was first known to the public in 1925 with name "Dream Girl International". In 2010, the pageant was split into three organizations. Miss Globe International, based in Turkey, is produced annually (currently inactive event) by RCA Global Entertainment Co. and organized by Rasim Aydın. Miss Globe based in Albania is yearly produced by another organization, Deliart Association and produced by Petri Bozo. In 2016, a third organizer, Miss Globe Group Inc. based in Ontario, Canada also started to organize an annual Miss Globe pageant headed by Albert Xhaferri and Dickson Ng.

The current winner of The Miss Globe is Anabel Payano of Dominican Republic who won in 2022.

History
The three Miss Globe pageants are a spin-off from the original Miss Globe, founded by Charlie See. Miss Globe was registered in the Bureau of Patents and Trademarks of Washington DC in 1925.

Rivne resident, Yulia Rybchuk from Ukraine, on November 12, 2020, became a finalist of the competition.

The Miss Globe
The following are the winners of The Miss Globe pageant arranged by Deliart association since 2004:

Country/Territory by number of wins

Miss Globe
The following are the winners of Miss Globe pageant arranged by Miss Globe Group Inc. since 1974:

Country/Territory by number of wins

Original titleholders

The following are original titleholders of Miss Globe International beauty contest before the pageant was split into 3 organizations in 2010:

See also
 List of beauty contests

References

References

 
International beauty pageants
Organizations based in Istanbul
Recurring events established in 1988